The 2015 Championship 1, known as the Kingstone Press League 1 for sponsorship reasons, was a semi-professional rugby league football competition played in England, the third tier of the sport in the country.

The 2015 Championship 1 will feature fourteen teams, who will all play each other once; Each team will then play nine other teams again, based on a geographical basis, totaling 22 games. Two teams will be promoted from Championship 1, due to the restructure of Super League, Championship and Championship 1. After the 22 regular season games, the top two sides will face each other and the winner will be automatically be promoted to the Kingstone Press Championship as champions, while the loser and the teams finishing 3rd, 4th and 5th will contest the play-offs and the winner will also be promoted. There is no relegation from this league as it is the lowest tier of professional rugby league.

2015 structure

The competition features the eight teams that did not win promotion in 2014: Gloucestershire All Golds, Hemel Stags, London Skolars, Newcastle Thunder, Oldham R.L.F.C., Oxford RLFC, South Wales Scorpions and York City Knights. It will also feature five teams relegated from the RFL Championship: Barrow Raiders, Keighley Cougars, North Wales Crusaders, Rochdale Hornets and Swinton Lions. Coventry Bears were also accepted into the division, creating a fourteen-team division.

Season table

Play Offs 

League One Grand Final

Oldham are League One Champions 2015 and are promoted to the 2016 Championship. Keighley Cougars will enter the play off semi finals for the second promotion place along with teams finishing 3rd, 4th and 5th.

League One Promotion Play Offs

Swinton won the play off final to secure the second and final promotion place to the 2016 Championship.

References 

https://www.bbc.co.uk/sport/rugby-league/league-one/table

External links
Official Website

RFL League 1
Rugby Football League Championship
2015 in English rugby league
2015 in Welsh rugby league